Park Kyung-ho (Hangul: 박경호, 20 May 1930 – 29 March 2021) was a Korean football player and manager. He played for the South Korea national team during the 1950s and was part of the squad that won the 1956 AFC Asian Cup. He was also part of the South Korea squad that achieved the silver medal at the 1958 Asian Games.

Honors
South Korea
 AFC Asian Cup: 1956

References 

1930 births
South Korean footballers
South Korea international footballers
South Korean football managers
AFC Asian Cup-winning players
Association football forwards
2021 deaths
Asian Games silver medalists for South Korea
Asian Games medalists in football
1956 AFC Asian Cup players
Medalists at the 1958 Asian Games
Footballers at the 1958 Asian Games